A Cup of Kindness is a 1934 British comedy film directed by and starring Tom Walls. It also featured Ralph Lynn, Robertson Hare, Dorothy Hyson and Claude Hulbert. It was based on a 1929 play by Ben Travers of the same name, one of the Aldwych farces, and had four of the same cast members. Graham Moffatt, later of Will Hay fame, made his debut appearance as a choir boy in this film.

Plot
The son and daughter of two feuding families announce their upcoming marriage, to widespread uproar.

Cast
 Tom Walls as Fred Tutt
 Ralph Lynn as Charlie Tutt
 Robertson Hare as Ernest Ramsbottom
 Dorothy Hyson as Betty Ramsbottom
 Claude Hulbert as Stanley Tutt
 Marie Wright as Mrs Ramsbottom
 Eva Moore as Mrs Tutt
 Veronica Rose as Tilly Wynn
 Gordon James as Nicholas Ramsbottom

References

External links
 

1934 comedy films
1934 films
Aldwych farce
British comedy films
1930s English-language films
Films set in London
Films directed by Tom Walls
Gainsborough Pictures films
Films shot at Lime Grove Studios
British black-and-white films
1930s British films